is a railway station in the town of  Yōrō, Yōrō District, Gifu Prefecture, Japan, operated by the private railway operator Yōrō Railway.

Lines

Station layout
Mino-Takada  Station has two opposed ground-level side platforms connected by a level crossing. The station is unattended.

Platforms

Adjacent stations

|-
!colspan=5|Yōrō Railway

History
Mino-Takada  Station opened on July 31, 1913.

Passenger statistics
In fiscal 2015, the station was used by an average of 892 passengers daily (boarding passengers only).

Surrounding area
 Yōrō Town Hall

See also
 List of Railway Stations in Japan

References

External links

 

Railway stations in Gifu Prefecture
Railway stations in Japan opened in 1913
Stations of Yōrō Railway
Yōrō District, Gifu
Yōrō, Gifu